Angel Hsu (born 23 February 1983) is an American climatologist and environmental scientist. She is the founder and head of the Data-Driven EnviroLab at the University of North Carolina at Chapel Hill.

Education 
Hsu's parents immigrated to South Carolina from Taiwan.
Hsu holds bachelor's degrees in biology and political science from Wake Forest University, a master's degree in environmental policy from the University of Cambridge, and a doctorate degree in forestry and environmental studies from Yale University. Her interest shifted from biology to public policy after researching insect-plant interactions in the Costa Rican rain forest.

Hsu has been married to Carlin Rosengarten since 29 May 2016.

Career 
Hsu has worked with the World Resources Institute in Washington, D.C. Hsu also worked at Yale-NUS College before becoming an assistant professor of Public Policy and the Environment, Ecology and Energy Program (E3P) at the University of North Carolina at Chapel Hill. 

Hsu is the founder and principal investigator of the Data-Driven EnviroLab (Data-Driven Lab), an interdisciplinary and international group of researchers working to strengthen environmental policy, founded in 2015.

Research 
Hsu's research deals with environmental decision-making. She has worked to foster cooperation between China and the United States on climate issues, and with corporations and local governments to coordinate reduction of carbon emissions. She uses quantitative methods to study the impact of policy, transparency and accountability and the actions of individuals, companies, cities and countries.

Hsu develops metrics and programs that aggregate "third wave data" and use it to measure and monitor progress towards reducing carbon emissions. For example, the  Urban Environment and Social Inclusion Index (UESI) can be used to track progress on both environmental conditions and social equity in cities. Her goals include identifying and filling gaps in information, and improving communication between scientists and policy-makers. 

Hsu was lead author of a study in 2020 of a study investigating racial disparities in urban heat island exposure, which are exacerbated by redlining and other unfairness in urban planning that lead to the hottest neighborhoods housing predominantly those of low socioeconomic status and people of color.

Hsu  was a lead author of the fifth chapter on the role of non-state and sub-national actors in the Intergovernmental Panel on Climate Change Emissions Gap Report of 2018. In 2021, Hsu testified before the U.S. Senate Committee on Energy and Natural Resources on  “Examining Global Climate Trends and Progress in addressing Climate Change”.

Awards
 2016, Inaugural Grist 50 Leader, Grist magazine

Selected publications

References

External links 

 
 The Data-Driven EnviroLab (Data-Driven Lab)

1983 births
American climatologists
Intergovernmental Panel on Climate Change contributing authors
Living people
21st-century American women scientists
21st-century American scientists
American women earth scientists
Wake Forest University alumni
Alumni of the University of Cambridge
Yale University alumni
University of North Carolina at Chapel Hill faculty
American women academics